Dectodesis is a genus of tephritid  or fruit flies in the family Tephritidae.

Species
Dectodesis bulligera (Bezzi, 1924)
Dectodesis bullosa (Bezzi, 1924)
Dectodesis comis (Munro, 1954)
Dectodesis confluens (Wiedemann, 1830)
Dectodesis eminens (Hering, 1942)
Dectodesis euarestina (Bezzi, 1924)
Dectodesis katomborae Hancock, 1986
Dectodesis luctans (Munro, 1929)
Dectodesis monticola Munro, 1957
Dectodesis spatiosa (Munro, 1954)

References

Tephritinae
Tephritidae genera
Diptera of Africa